The Owl Dives Through the Crescent Moon is the second studio album, by keyboardist Travis Dickerson. The album was released in February 2012.

The album features the collaborations of bassist Paul Ill, guitarist Lindy Dickerson, and drummer DJ Bonebrake. All of them collaborated on Dickerson's previous album Iconography. As opposed to his previous release, Dickerson now serves also as vocalist. Talking about this new role Dickerson explains:

The album was made available for pre-release on February 1 through TDRS Music while also releasing an EP consisting of 3 full songs from the album for free. On February 25, 2012, the album was shipped, with the first 100 copies containing a poster signed by the band.

Track listing

Personnel
 Travis Dickerson – keyboards, vocals
 Paul Ill – bass
 Lindy Dickerson – guitar
 DJ Bonebrake – drums

References

2012 albums
Travis Dickerson albums
TDRS Music albums